= Dean W. Gonzalez =

Dean Wayne Gonzalez (January 3, 1958 – August 13, 1994) was the co-author of "Introduction to Ada for Programmers" along with Dr. David A. Cook, a fellow faculty member at the United States Air Force Academy.

The son of Ivy Gonzalez (née Colbourne) of Newfoundland, Canada and Carmelo Gonzalez of Puerto Rico, Dean graduated from the United States Air Force Academy in May 1980 with honors as the outstanding graduating cadet in computer science. He later obtained his master's degree from UCLA. He later returned to teach at the academy, where he distinguished himself as a research faculty member and instructor. Later, he became a civilian software engineer, working for Decision Science Applications, in Colorado Springs, Colorado.

Gonzalez was killed during a hang-gliding accident in 1994 and is survived by his wife Gina and two children (Luci and Robert), two brothers (David and Darryl), a sister (Deborah), and his parents.

== Books written ==
- Dean W. Gonzalez: Ada Programmer's Handbook, Benjamin-Cummings Publishing Company, ISBN 0-8053-2529-8
